Francisco Clavet was the defending champion, but lost in the first round to Alberto Berasategui.

Alberto Martín won the title by defeating Karim Alami 6–2, 6–3 in the final.

Seeds

Draw

Finals

Top half

Bottom half

References

External links
 Official results archive (ATP)
 Official results archive (ITF)

1999 Singles
Singles
1999 in Romanian sport